One for Me is an album by organist Shirley Scott recorded in 1974 and released on the Strata-East label.

Reception
The Allmusic site awarded the album 3 stars stating "while it is nothing overly heavy or deep, it's thoughtfully and sensitively produced and of its kind an almost perfect album".

Track listing 
All compositions by Shirley Scott except as indicated
 "What Makes Harold Sing?" - 8:53 
 "Keep on Movin' On" (Harold Vick) - 9:52
 "Big George" - 5:22
 "Don't Look Back" - 8:56
 "Do You Know a Good Thing When You See One?" - 8:51

Personnel 
 Shirley Scott - organ, mellotron
 Harold Vick - tenor saxophone
 Billy Higgins - drums
 Jimmy Hopps - cowbell (track 2)

References 

1975 albums
Strata-East Records albums
Shirley Scott albums